The Cross by the Brook (Czech: Kříž u potoka)  is a 1921 Czechoslovak silent drama film directed by Jan S. Kolár based on Based on the novel by Karolina Světlá.

Cast
Přemysl Pražský as Mikeš Potocký 
Rudolf Myzet as Franík Potocký 
Karel Noll  as  Kobosil 
Kamila Maroldová  as Józa 
Emil Focht  as   Dolanský 
Růžena Maturová  as  Dolanská 
Natasa Cyganková as  Evička 
Theodor Pištěk  as Ambrož Potocký 
Hugo Svoboda  as   Štepán Potocký 
František Beranský  as   Hovorka 
Alois Sedláček as   Oldest Town Councillor 
Vojtech Záhořík  as   Taverner 
Arnoštka Záhoříková as   Maid 
Bronislava Livia  as   Marička Holá 
Josef Šváb-Malostranský  as   Rich farmer

References

External links 
 

1921 films
1921 drama films
Czechoslovak black-and-white films
Czech silent films
Czechoslovak drama films
Silent drama films